"When I Call Your Name" is the debut solo single by Mary Kiani. It was produced by Nightcrawlers, and charted at No. 18 on the UK Singles Chart.

Track listings and formats

References

1995 songs
1995 debut singles
Mary Kiani songs
Mercury Records singles